Michelle Suzanne Dockery (born 15 December 1981) is an English television and film actress. She is best known for her leading performance as Lady Mary Crawley in the ITV television period drama series Downton Abbey (2010–2015), for which she was nominated for a Golden Globe Award and three consecutive Primetime Emmy Awards for Outstanding Lead Actress in a Drama Series.

Dockery made her professional stage debut in His Dark Materials in 2004. For her role as Eliza Doolittle in the 2007 London revival of Pygmalion, she was nominated for the Evening Standard Award. For her role in the 2009 play Burnt by the Sun, she earned an Olivier Award nomination for Best Supporting Actress.

Dockery has appeared in the films Hanna (2011), Anna Karenina (2012), Non-Stop (2014), and The Gentlemen (2019). On television, Dockery has also played lead roles on the drama series Good Behavior and the Netflix miniseries Godless, for which she received her fourth Emmy nomination, and the drama miniseries Defending Jacob (2020). She played Kate Woodcroft in Netflix's anthology drama miniseries Anatomy of a Scandal (2022).

Early life 
Dockery is the daughter of Lorraine, a care home assistant from Stepney, England, and Michael Dockery an environmental chemist from Athlone, Ireland. She grew up in Romford in Essex and she still has traces of an Estuary accent.

Dockery has two older sisters, Louise and Joanne. She was educated first at Chadwell Heath Academy, and later at the Finch Stage School.

After her A Levels, she enrolled at the Guildhall School of Music & Drama, where she was awarded the gold medal for Drama at her graduation in 2004.

Career

Stage 
Dockery was a member of the National Youth Theatre. She made her professional debut in His Dark Materials at the Royal National Theatre in 2004. In 2006, she was nominated for the Ian Charleson Award for her performance as Dina Dorf in Pillars of the Community at the National Theatre. She appeared in Burnt by the Sun at the National Theatre, for which she received an Olivier Award nomination for Best Supporting Actress.

She won second prize at the Ian Charleson Awards for her performance as Eliza Doolittle in Peter Hall's production of Pygmalion at the Theatre Royal, Bath, which toured the UK and transferred to The Old Vic in 2008, and for the same production was nominated Best Newcomer at the Evening Standard Awards 2008.

In 2010, she played Ophelia in Hamlet at the Crucible Theatre alongside John Simm.

Film and television 

In 2006, Dockery starred as Susan Sto Helit in a two-part adaptation of Terry Pratchett's novel Hogfather. In 2008, she played Kathryn in Channel 4's The Red Riding Trilogy and played the guest lead of tormented rape victim Gemma Morrison in BBC's Waking the Dead. In 2009, she appeared in the two-part Cranford Christmas special for the BBC, and she also starred as the lead character, as the young governess, in a modernised BBC adaptation of The Turn of the Screw with her future Downton Abbey co-star Dan Stevens, in the role of her psychiatrist.

Dockery came to public prominence in 2010 when she played Lady Mary Crawley in Julian Fellowes' series Downton Abbey. Downton Abbey was filmed from February–August 2010–15. The series was broadcast on ITV September–November, with a special Christmas night episode for Series 2–6 in 2011–15, with a later airing schedule in the U.S. for PBS.

For her role as Lady Mary Crawley in the Downton Abbey series, Dockery received three consecutive Emmy Award nominations in the category for Outstanding Lead Actress In Drama Series – 2012, 2013, and 2014. She also earned a Golden Globe nomination in 2013.

Dockery's first big screen role was as False Marissa in Hanna (2011). In 2012, she appeared as Princess Myagkaya in the film adaptation of Anna Karenina and starred with Charlotte Rampling in a two-part dramatisation of William Boyd's spy thriller Restless on BBC One. In January 2014, she appeared in the action thriller feature film Non-Stop alongside co-stars Liam Neeson, Julianne Moore, and Lupita Nyong'o.

In 2014, Dockery was made Fellow of the Guildhall School in recognition of her achievements in television. In 2014, Dockery was listed in The Sunday Times Britain's 500 Most Influential People, which is a compilation of the most significant individuals in the UK who have demonstrated outstanding qualities of influence, achievement and inspiration.

In a departure from her portrayal of Lady Mary in Downton Abbey, Dockery advanced her Hollywood career with a 2015 performance in the sci-fi thriller feature film Self/less with Ryan Reynolds.

Beginning in November 2016, Dockery starred in the lead role of Letty Raines in Good Behavior, an American drama series based on the novella series by Blake Crouch. Letty is a drug-addicted thief and con-artist who, released early from prison on good behaviour, is attempting to get her life under control. This is complicated by a chance meeting and subsequent entanglement with a charismatic hitman, played by Juan Diego Botto. The 10-episode first season, airing on U.S. basic-cable network TNT, was filmed in and around Wilmington, North Carolina. In January 2017, the show was picked up for a second season. In November 2018, the series was cancelled after two seasons.

In 2017, Dockery starred alongside Jim Broadbent, Charlotte Rampling, Harriet Walter, and Emily Mortimer in the British film The Sense of an Ending from CBS Films, based on the Booker-winning novel of the same name by Julian Barnes. She plays Susie Webster, the daughter of Tony Webster (Jim Broadbent), a man who lives in quiet unquestioning solitude until he confronts secrets of his past. "The film is a beautiful adaptation of the book which I love. And I jumped at the chance to work with director Ritesh Batra, who also filmed The Lunchbox (2013)", explains Dockery.

Later that year, Dockery played a lead role in the Netflix western miniseries Godless. In 2019, Dockery reprised her lead role as Lady Mary Crawley in the Downton Abbey film, alongside Hugh Bonneville and Maggie Smith. The film received generally positive reviews from critics and was a major financial success, grossing $192 million. Later in 2019, Dockery starred in the Guy Ritchie directed The Gentlemen, as the wife of a drug baron played by Matthew McConaughey. The film, which opened in wide release in 2020, was met with mixed to positive reviews, though Dockery's performance as Ros was praised, and has grossed over $100 million worldwide.

Music 
Dockery is a trained singer. She sang at the 50th Anniversary of Ronnie Scott's Jazz Club in London and has occasionally sung with Sadie and the Hotheads, a band formed by Elizabeth McGovern, who played her mother in Downton Abbey. In February 2022, it was announced that Dockery and her Downton Abbey co-star Michael C. Fox has signed a record deal with Decca Records as the duo Michelle and Michael.

Charity work 
On World Humanitarian Day 2014, Oxfam announced Dockery as its first ever Humanitarian Ambassador. Dockery is also a patron of Changing Faces, as well as other charities.

In 2014, Dockery was one of nine British celebrities featured in a short film promoting Stand Up to Cancer UK.

Personal life 
Dockery began a relationship with John Dineen, from Waterfall, Ireland, in 2013. The actress had been introduced to Dineen, then a public relations director at FTI Consulting in London, by Irish actor Allen Leech, who appeared alongside Dockery in Downton Abbey. The couple were first pictured together when they were on holiday in Venice, Italy, during the 2013 Venice International Film Festival. In 2015, it was reported that they were engaged, with Dockery showing off a diamond ring to her co-stars during screen tests. 

Dineen died from a rare form of cancer on 13 December 2015, at age 34, in Marymount Hospice in Cork, with Dockery at his bedside.

Dockery has been in a relationship with Jasper Waller-Bridge, brother of Fleabag creator Phoebe Waller-Bridge and composer Isobel Waller-Bridge, since 2019. They announced their engagement in January 2022.

Filmography

Film

Television

Stage roles

Awards and nominations

References

External links 

1981 births
Living people
21st-century English actresses
Actresses from London
Alumni of the Guildhall School of Music and Drama
National Youth Theatre members
British women singers
Singers from London
People from Romford
British people of Irish descent
People from Rush Green, London
21st-century English women singers
21st-century English singers
English film actresses
English television actresses
English stage actresses
English voice actresses